Gary Breit (June 18, 1960) is a Canadian keyboardist and vocalist best known for his collaboration with singer/songwriter Bryan Adams. He has also recorded with acts such as Amanda Marshall, Cassandra Wilson, Corey Hart, Amy Sky, Long John Baldry, Damhnait Doyle and has toured with Kim Mitchell and Bryan Adams. He has also released an album entitled Breit Bros with his brothers Kevin and Garth.

Breit played keyboards on Adams' 2004 album Room Service after the departure of Adams' former keyboardist, Tommy Mandel. He has subsequently toured continuously with Adams and his band.

Appearances
 1984 – The Pukka Orchestra – synthesizers
 1985 – Corey Hart - Boy in the Box – synthesizers
 1988 – Breit Bros. – synthesizers and backing vocals
 1995 – Cassandra Wilson- New Moon Daughter – organ
 1997 – Vermillion Skye - Random Kinetic Overtures – guest artist: synthesizers
 1999 – Kim Mitchell  Kimosabe – synthesizers
 2003 – Shaye- The Bridge – organ and piano
 2004 – Bryan Adams- Room Service – synthesizers
 2008 – Bryan Adams- 11 – organ and piano

References 

Year of birth missing (living people)
Living people
Canadian rock keyboardists
Canadian male pianists
Canadian rock pianists